Paramoltkia doerfleri is a flowering plant native to Albania and southern parts of the former Yugoslavia.

References 
 Global Biodiversity Information Facility (GBIF) entry

Boraginaceae
Flora of Albania